Pat Cairney (born 4 June 1959) was a Scottish footballer who played for Airdrie, Stranraer and Dumbarton.

References

1959 births
Scottish footballers
Dumbarton F.C. players
Airdrieonians F.C. (1878) players
Stranraer F.C. players
Scottish Football League players
Living people
Association football central defenders